Trader, in comics, may refer to:

One of the Elders of the Universe, a group of ancient beings in Marvel Comics
One of the Chicago Morlocks, a group of mutants in Marvel Comics

Elders of the Universe
Marvel Comics characters